The 2006 Kuril Islands earthquake occurred on November 15 at  with a  magnitude of 8.3 and a maximum Mercalli intensity of VII (Very Strong) and a maximum Shindo intensity of JMA 2. This megathrust earthquake was the largest event in the central Kuril Islands since 1915 and generated a small tsunami that affected the northern Japanese coast. The tsunami crossed the Pacific Ocean and damaged the harbor at Crescent City, California.

This earthquake is also considered a doublet of the 2007 Kuril Islands earthquake that hit the same area on January 13, 2007.

Tsunami
At about 11:45 UTC, tsunami warnings were issued in Japan for the north coasts of Hokkaidō and Honshū, and a number of towns in this area were very quickly evacuated.  Tsunami warnings, advisories and watches were also issued for the coastal areas of Alaska, Hawaii, parts of British Columbia, Washington, Oregon, and California.  JMA initially estimated tsunami waves to be as tall as 2 metres when it hit the Japanese northern and eastern coasts, but it turned out to be merely 40 centimetres when it reached Hanasaki Ko, Nemuro, Nemuro, Hokkaidō at 9:29 pm local time. The tsunami also hit the rest of Hokkaidō and Tōhoku Region. The tallest wave recorded in Japan was at Tsubota (坪田), Miyakejima (三宅島) in the Izu Shotō of the Tokyo To, at 84 centimetres. Tsunami also hit as far as Anami in Kagoshima Prefecture and Naha in Okinawa Prefecture, and reached the Hawaiian and California coasts. A 176-centimetre wave in the harbor at Crescent City, California caused an estimated $10 million in damage to the docks there. The United States authorities had issued warnings for the Russian Far East, Japan, Wake Island and Midway Atoll.

The nearfield tsunami struck islands with no current inhabitants.  However, geologists and archaeologists had visited these islands the previous summer, and returned in the summers of 2007 and 2008.  Because there were two central Kurils tsunamis in the winter of 2006/2007 (see 2007 Kuril Islands earthquake), the specific effects of each tsunami are difficult to determine; but evidence shows that the 2006 tsunami was the larger on all islands in the Kurils except for parts of Rasshua.

See also
List of earthquakes in 2006
List of earthquakes in Russia
List of earthquakes in Japan
1952 Severo-Kurilsk earthquake
1963 Kuril Islands earthquake
1994 Kuril Islands earthquake
2007 Kuril Islands earthquake

References

Sources

External links

Japan's false alarm showcases tsunami alert system – The Christian Science Monitor
Small tsunamis hit northern Japan – BBC News
Central Kuril Island Tsunami in Crescent City, California (11/15/2006) – University of Southern California
Small tsunami waves hit Japan after earthquake – Associated Press
Global Surge of Great Earthquakes—What We Are Learning From Them – IRIS Consortium

2006 Kuril Islands earthquake
Megathrust earthquakes in Japan
Megathrust earthquakes in Russia
Doublet earthquakes
2006 tsunamis
Earthquakes in the Russian Far East
Kuril Islands earthquake
Kuril Islands earthquake
Kuril Islands earthquake
Tsunamis in Russia
November 2006 events in Asia
Kuril Islands
November 2006 events in Russia
November 2006 events in Japan
2006 disasters in Japan